Per Martinsen (28 April 1936 – 12 January 2021) was a Norwegian footballer. He played in two matches for the Norway national football team in 1962.

References

External links
 

1936 births
2021 deaths
Norwegian footballers
Norway international footballers
Place of birth missing
Association footballers not categorized by position